Sahar Jahani is an American writer, known for working on several popular television series, including 13 Reasons Why, and Ramy.
In 2020 she was hired to write an adaptation of Uzma Jalaluddin's novel Ayesha at Last for Pascal Pictures.

Educational career

Jahani graduated from film studies at the University of California at Irvine, in 2013.  In 2019, as a successful alumnus, she was invited to join a panel on the changing landscape of film/television creation and distribution at Zotfest, the school's student film festival.

Film career

In February 2019 Jahani was a founding member of Muslim Women in Film & Television.

Filmography

References

American women screenwriters
American film directors
Year of birth missing (living people)
Living people
American Muslims
21st-century American screenwriters
21st-century American women writers
American women film directors
University of California, Irvine alumni